Qalandar-e Laki (also Romanized as Qalandar-e Lakī) is a village in Mahidasht Rural District, Mahidasht District, Kermanshah County, Kermanshah Province, Iran. At the 2006 census, its population was 254, in 50 families.

References 

Populated places in Kermanshah County